Guahibo, Guajibo or Sikuani may refer to:

 Guahibo people, an ethnic group of Colombia and Venezuela
 Guahibo language, a language of Colombia and Venezuela